Mother of Mercy High School was an all-girls Catholic, private high school in Cincinnati, Ohio. It was one of almost 40 Sisters of Mercy secondary schools in the United States and also a Blue Ribbon School. It opened in 1915 and in 2018 merged with another Sisters of Mercy school, McAuley High School, due to lacking enrollment numbers at both schools. The merged school, Mercy McAuley High School, opened at what was the McAuley campus in fall 2018.

In 2018, the closed school was sold to Cincinnati Public Schools for the price of $2.85 million. Gamble Montessori High School uses the former Mother of Mercy building.

Ohio High School Athletic Association State Championships
 Girls Volleyball – 1977, 1980, 1982, 2007

References

External links
 

Educational institutions established in 1915
Educational institutions disestablished in 2018
High schools in Hamilton County, Ohio
Private schools in Cincinnati
Defunct Catholic secondary schools in Ohio
Girls' schools in Ohio
1915 establishments in Ohio
2018 disestablishments in Ohio
Sisters of Mercy schools
Roman Catholic Archdiocese of Cincinnati